The People's Federation of the Saami or the Saami Peoples Union is an organization for the Sami people in Norway. The Federation was established in 1993. It is a member organization of the Saami Council.

References

External links
Official site

Sámi associations
Saami Council
Indigenous rights organizations in Europe
Indigenous organisations in Norway